Râșnov may refer to:

 Râșnov, a town in Brașov County, Romania.
 Râșnov Fortress, historic monument and landmark in Romania.
 Râșnov River, a tributary of the Sohodol River in Romania.